Third-seeded Lindsay Davenport was the defending champion and won in the final 6–3, 7–6 against Barbara Paulus.

Seeds
A champion seed is indicated in bold text while text in italics indicates the round in which that seed was eliminated.

  Anke Huber (quarterfinals)
  Kimiko Date (first round)
  Lindsay Davenport (champion)
  Mary Joe Fernández (second round)
  Barbara Paulus (final)
  Nathalie Tauziat (quarterfinals)
  Judith Wiesner (semifinals)
  Sandrine Testud (first round)

Draw

References

External links
 1996 Internationaux de Strasbourg draw 

1996
1996 WTA Tour
1996 in French sport